Eșelnița is a commune located in Mehedinți County, Romania. It is composed of a single village, Eșelnița. It is one of four localities in the county located in the Banat. At the 2011 census, 74% of inhabitants were Romanians, 23.4% Roma and 2% Czechs.

The commune has borne a number of similar names: Jeselnița (1925-1932), Ieșelnița (1932-1950), Eselnița (1950-1956), Ieșelnița (1956-1996) and Eșelnița (since 1996).

References

Communes in Mehedinți County
Czech communities in Romania
Localities in Romanian Banat
Populated places on the Danube